Fountainhall railway station served the village of Fountainhall, Scottish Borders from 1848 to 1969 on the Waverley Route.

History 
The station opened as Burnhouse or Fountainhall on 1 August 1848 by the North British Railway.

The station was situated on the south side of an unnamed minor road. The  goods yard consisted of three sidings with the siding closest to the main line passing through a large goods shed. The yard was equipped with 1¼ ton crane and could handle live stock.

The station became a junction when the Lauder Light Railway was opened on 2 July 1901, the station's name was changed to Fountainhall Junction from this date.

The Lauder branch closed to passengers on 12 September 1932 and to goods on 1 October 1958.

The station was host to a LNER camping coach from 1935 to 1939. A camping coach was also positioned here by the Scottish Region from 1958 to 1960.

The station was still named Fountainhall Junction until April 1959, even though the LNER timetable of 1937 didn't use the 'junction' suffix.

The station was closed to goods on 28 April 1964, with the remaining sidings quickly lifted and was closed to passengers on 6 January 1969 

In September 2015, the Waverley Route partially reopened as part of the Borders Railway. Although the railway passes through the original Fountainhall station, it was not reopened.

Notes

References

External links 
Fountainhall station on disused-stations
Fountainhall station at Canmore
The Borders Railway near Fountainhall on Geograph

Disused railway stations in the Scottish Borders
Former North British Railway stations
Railway stations in Great Britain opened in 1848
Railway stations in Great Britain closed in 1969
Beeching closures in Scotland